The Grand Northern Ukulele Festival (GNUF) is a multi-award-winning UK-based ukulele festival that takes place in Huddersfield, England every spring. It was established in 2013 and has been the recipient of multiple awards.

Festival organisation
GNUF is a volunteer-run festival that is also not-for-profit. It is described as: an inclusive, inspiring weekend of arts and music in Huddersfield, England and as a one-of-a-kind event featuring ukuleles and so much more where there is truly something for everyone 
 & 
GNUF was built on three key principles: making things, making connections and sharing knowledge. As described on their webpage, the team behind it continue to believe in those ideas and keep expanding opportunities on offer to include features and activities for an ever wider range of ages and communities. A stated goal of the festival team is to work closely with partners to try to ensure there truly is something for everyone.

In 2014, George Hinchliffe of the Ukulele Orchestra of Great Britain described, the festival as "truly amazing".

The festival works with local businesses who bring their wares and skills to the festival. The festival team also works with a wide range of ukulele players and festivals around the world to develop and grow their event. In the past, they have worked with ukulele brands, Ohana, Kala, KoAloha and Kanilea and have advised organisers of events in the UK and elsewhere.

TeamGNUF and the festival as a whole also promote tours and events outside the festival.

Festival dates and headliners

Festival team
The festival producer and director is Professor of Creative Media, Mary Agnes Krell. She has worked in the UK and the US in performance, media and higher education for decades. Though from the US, she is based in the UK and runs the festival in her spare time. To learn more about Mary Agnes Krell, see the interview with her on Hebden Bridge's community site: HebWeb Interview with Mary.

Robert Collins, a ukulele luthier from Hebden Bridge is the co-director, and a founding member of the festival team. His responsibilities include the development of "making" workshops.

Audra "Mim" Jeppson, a ukulele dealer from Virginia, USA, is the "Overseer of Enthusiasm." Her responsibilities include organising and running the open mic elements of the festival.

Robin Evans joined the festival team in 2017 and acts in an festival outreach role, liaising with other ukulele festivals and events, to allow communication and help collaboration with other festivals and events.

Sally & Mark Davies joined the team in 2017, Sally being a seasoned ukulele player, and Mark lending logistical and sound support during the event.

Simon Taylor, from Farnborough, Hampshire also joined in 2017, a proponent of ukulele music via his Cool Cat Ukes website and activities, competitions brought to the GNUF event.

Awards

References

External links
Official website

Music festivals in Yorkshire
Ukuleles